Mark McHugh is an Irish rugby union former player who played at full-back and out-half. In his club career, he represented Leinster, Connacht, St Mary's College RFC, Galwegians RFC, Montpellier, Nice.

He played internationally for the Ireland national rugby union team, winning one cap in 2003 against Tonga. He also played for the Ireland national rugby sevens team, representing them in the World Rugby Sevens Series.

References

St Mary's College RFC players
Leinster Rugby players
Galwegians RFC players
Connacht Rugby players
Irish rugby union players
Ireland international rugby union players
Living people
Year of birth missing (living people)
Rugby union fullbacks